The Jerningham wine cooler is a large wine cooler made out of silver in the 18th century.

History 
The original was commissioned 1734–1735 in London by Henry Jernegan (Jerningham) of Russell Street, a London goldsmith-banker, whose client, Littleton Poyntz Meynell, wanted to have the largest ever silver wine cistern ever to have been made. Jernegan employed the sculptor John Michael Rysbrack to model the Bacchanalian scenes on the bowl, the crouching panthers beneath and the satyr handles. It took a team of silversmiths, chasers and engravers four years to make and weighed 8,000 ozs. The leading silversmith, whose mark is struck on the cistern, was the German immigrant, Charles Kandler (probably Carl Rudolf Kaendler, elder brother of the famous Meissen porcelain modeller). When asked by Henry Jernegan to pay the final bill for the cistern, however, Meynell refused and in 1737, Jernegan offered the cooler as a lottery prize. The smallest prizes in the lottery were specially struck medals about five or six shillings each. The winner, Major William Battine of East Marden, Sussex, appears to have sold the cooler to the regent Grand Duchess Anna Leopoldovna of Russia in 1738. Since 1743 the cooler has been in the Hermitage Museum, St. Petersburg.

An electrotype (silver on copper core) copy was made during the Victorian Age in 1884 in Birmingham by Elkington & Co. in celebration of the original. This copy (see photo) is now located in the Victoria and Albert Museum. There is another electrotype copy in the Metropolitan Museum in New York, and also in the Queen's Regimental Silver in England.

Wine accessories
Collection of the Hermitage Museum
Collections of the Victoria and Albert Museum
1735 works
Silver sculptures